Robert Bertram Pierce (8 March 1886 – 14 August 1968) was an Australian rules footballer who played for the St Kilda Football Club in the Victorian Football League (VFL).

Notes

External links 

1886 births
1968 deaths
Australian rules footballers from Victoria (Australia)
St Kilda Football Club players